The 50th Battalion (Calgary), CEF, was an infantry battalion of the Canadian Expeditionary Force during the Great War. The 50th Battalion was authorized on 7 November 1914 and embarked for Britain on 27 October 1915. The battalion disembarked in France on 11 August 1916, where it fought as part of the 10th Canadian Infantry Brigade, 4th Canadian Division in France and Flanders until the end of the war.  The battalion was disbanded on 30 August 1920.

The 50th Battalion recruited in and was mobilized at Calgary, Alberta.

Officers commanding

The 50th Battalion had four officers commanding:
Lieutenant-Colonel E.G. Mason, 27 October 1915 11 November 1916
Major R.B. Eaton, 11 November 1916 1 January 1917
Major C.B. Worsnop, DSO, 1 January 1917 11 March 1917
Lieutenant-Colonel Lionel Frank Page, DSO, 11 March 1917 demobilization

Victoria Cross
One member of the 50th Battalion was awarded the Victoria Cross. Private John George Pattison was awarded the medal for his actions on 10 April 1917 during the Battle of Vimy Ridge. He was subsequently killed in action at Lens, France, on 3 June 1917

Operational history

1916

Ancre Heights/Somme 
The battalion was ordered to Ancre Heights in October. Ancre Heights was the scene of Canada's first involvement in the Battle of the Somme, which had begun on July 1 and which ultimately resulted in 25,000 Canadian casualties. Later, the 50th was ordered into the fighting and during the battle, the 50th Battalion's non-commissioned officers (NCOs)  suffered heavily. Positioned in the second wave, they were killed by hidden German machine-gun posts that had been bypassed by the initial assault.

1917

Vimy Ridge 
From the Somme, the battalion was moved northward to Artois in November 1916, where they spent their winter and Christmas preparing for the offensive against Vimy Ridge. From January to March, the 4th Division's artillery provided part of the pre-battle barrage. In March, the Canadian Corps changed the commander of the battalion, as Colonel E.G. Mason was transferred to another battalion and replaced Lieutenant-Colonel Page.  In April, the Canadians made their three-day offensive, starting the Battle of Vimy Ridge.

The 50th Battalion and the rest of the 4th Canadian Division were assigned to attack Hill 145. After many attempts to capture the hill, they finally managed to take it from the Bavarian Reserve force. For the next two days, the 4th Canadian Division and 50th Battalion tried to attack the little knoll known as the Pimple. Finally, the Bavarians, low on food and having suffered many casualties, surrendered the Pimple and retreated from Vimy. The 50th, having suffered heavy casualties, were taken out of the line and rested for a while.

Lens and Passchendaele 
After Vimy the 50th Battalion, with the rest of the Canadian Corps, started preparations for the Battle of Hill 70. They fought the Germans in the streets of Lens and in the generating plant, which a group of Germans had fortified. After a hard-fought battle there, the Canadians gained a reputation as elite or storm troops. During this battle, they were taken out of the line for a little bit, and put into billets. They stayed with French families in their remaining small houses.

Field Marshal Sir Douglas Haig then ordered them into the heavy fighting at Liévin and Hill 65 in June and July 1917. After suffering low casualty rates, the Canadians were ordered to one of the costliest battles in the war, the Third Battle of Ypres. The Canadians suffered 16,000 dead and many more wounded, while 50th Battalion lost a quarter of their fighting men. The Canadian Corps was successful, however, capturing the village of Passchendaele. After the battle at Passchendaele, the Canadians finally got a break and they had Christmas dinner at Château de la Haie. During the initial stages of the German spring offensive that was launched in early 1918, the 50th Battalion, along with the other Canadian units, was out of the line conducting training and, as a result, missed the heaviest part of the fighting.

1918

Kaiser's Battle 
During this German offensive, dedicated to the German Kaiser, the Germans managed to penetrate the Allied front lines and push them back almost all the way to Paris, but the Allies took advantage of the barrier provided by the Marne River situated just outside Paris, where they subsequently managed to halt the German advance. The Germans, wasted after having to sacrifice a large amount of their troops during the offensive, could not withstand the strong Allied push that followed and which ultimately brought about an end to the war.

Llandovery Castle operations 
In 1918, a Canadian medical ship,  was sunk by a German U-boat, even though Llandovery Castle had a white flag put up. The Canadians, furious with the Germans, started an offensive dedicated to Llandovery Castle. The 50th fought in Llandovery Castle operations, during which they managed to liberate a few towns and villages.

Canada's Hundred Days 
The German advance to Paris was halted by the Second Battle of the Marne. After years of stalemate on the Western Front, the war was finally coming to an end. In the last 100 days, the 50th Battalion fought at the Battle of Amiens on August 8–10; the Second Battle of the Somme (1918), which was also known as the Battle of Arras; the Battle of Cambrai, where they helped recapture Cambrai and hold it against German attacks; the battle of Drocourt-Quéant where the 50th Battalion helped to defeat the German defensive line; the Battle of the Canal du Nord, where the Canadian Corps, with 50th Battalion crossed the canal; and the Battle of Valenciennes, one of the last battles of the war, where Mons was captured. By then, the Germans were retreating from France and Belgium. On November 11, on the eleventh hour, the Germans agreed to an armistice, ending the First World War.

Perpetuation 
The 50th Battalion (Calgary), CEF, is perpetuated by The King's Own Calgary Regiment (RCAC).

Battle honours 
The 50th Battalion was awarded the following battle honours:
SOMME, 1916
Ancre Heights
Ancre, 1916
Vimy, 1917
HILL 70
Ypres 1917
Passchendaele
AMIENS
Scarpe '18
Drocourt-Quéant
HINDENBURG LINE
Canal du Nord
VALENCIENNES
FRANCE AND FLANDERS, 1916-18

Records 
The history of the 50th Battalion is recorded in books and in letters that kept by their families or discovered by historians later in years. A few examples of members whose stories have been told are Richard Playfair and Victor W. Wheeler.

Notable 50th Battalion men 
Sergeant Edward Staves, Military Medal 
Private "Ducky" Henry Norwest (Sniper)
Private Victor Wheeler (Signaller)
Colonel E.G. Mason (commander)
Colonel Page (commander)
Private John George Pattison, VC
Lieutenant Joseph Emmett Stauffer

Memorials 
Soldiers of the 50th Battalion that went missing in action are memorialized on the Menin Gate and the Vimy Memorial. Soldiers of the battalion killed in action are commemorated on the Calgary Soldiers' Memorial, dedicated in April 2011. There is also a bridge over the Elbow River in Calgary named after John George Pattison, VC.

Engagements

Training, 1914–1916 
Formation to August 1916: training in various places in Canada, Great Britain and France

Somme Front, 1916 
October 1 – November 11, 1916: the Battle of Ancre Heights
July 1 – November 18, 1916: the Battle of the Somme

Vimy Front, 1917 
January–April, 1917: preparation for The Battle of Vimy Ridge
April 9–12, 1917: the Battle of Vimy Ridge

Lens Front, 1917 
August 15–25: attack on Hill 70

Ypres Front, 1917 
July 31 – November 10, 1917: Third Battle of Ypres or the Battle of Passchendaele

Training, 1917–1918 
December 1917: Christmas at Château de la Haie
January–July 1918: training in France

Hundred Days' Offensive, 1918 
August 8–11, 1918: the Battle of Amiens
August 21 – September 2, 1918: the Second Battle of the Somme
September 27 – October 1, 1918: the Battle of Canal du Nord
October 8–10, 1918: the Battle of Cambrai
November 11, 1918: the Battle of Valenciennes (also known as the Capture of Mons)

See also 
 The Calgary Tigers football team was renamed Calgary 50th Battalion for the 1923 and 1924 seasons in the Alberta Rugby Football Union to commemorate the battalion.
 List of infantry battalions in the Canadian Expeditionary Force

References 
Citations

Sources
Canadian Expeditionary Force 1914-1919 by Col. G. W. L. Nicholson, CD, Queen's Printer, Ottawa, Ontario, 1962

Bibliography

External links 
 The Ross Playfair Letters Project

050
Military units and formations established in 1914
Military units and formations disestablished in 1920
Military units and formations of Alberta
King's Own Calgary Regiment